John Reddaway CMG, OBE (12 April 1916 – 25 June 1990) was a diplomat who served as Deputy Commissioner-General of the United Nations Relief and Works Agency for Palestine Refugees in the Near East (UNRWA), 1960–68.

He was born in Ilford and educated at Ilford County High School and the University of Reading.

Career: Colonial Administrative Service, Cyprus, 1938; Imperial Defence College, 1954; Administrative Secretary, Cyprus, 1957–60; Deputy Commissioner-General, United Nations Relief and Works Agency, 1960–8; Director-General, Arab-British Centre, London, 1970–80.

He was awarded the OBE in 1957 and the CMG in 1959.

As Director of the Arab-British Centre, he was involved in Paris with  Lucien Bitterlin's EURABIA Committee ("European Coordinating Committee of Friendship Societies with the Arab World") where he represented the Council for the Advancement of Arab-British Understanding. He co-signed some publications of this EURABIA Committee.

References

1916 births
1990 deaths
Alumni of the University of Reading
Colonial Administrative Service officers
People from Ilford
People educated at Ilford County High School
Companions of the Order of St Michael and St George
Officers of the Order of the British Empire
British officials of the United Nations
Graduates of the Royal College of Defence Studies